Thomas Fielden may refer to:

 Thomas Fielden (musician) (1883–1974), British pianist and music teacher
 Thomas Fielden (politician) (1854–1897), British Conservative Party politician